The Javan green magpie (Cissa thalassina) is a passerine bird in the crow family, Corvidae. This critically endangered species is endemic to montane forests on the Indonesian island of Java. It formerly included the Bornean green magpie as a subspecies, in which case the "combined" species was known as the short-tailed magpie. The bright green plumage is the result of the yellow pigment lutein, which they gain from their insect diet. They also feed on small lizards and frogs. Initially juveniles are bluish, but they become green after their first moult. In captivity, adults turn bluish if their diet is inadequate. 

Once common, the species has declined drastically as a result of habitat loss and illegal capture for the wild animal trade. The size of the remaining wild population is unknown, but perhaps only around 50 individuals, while others speculate that the lack of recent sightings might mean that it already is extinct in the wild. In an attempt at saving the species, a captive breeding program based on confiscated individuals has been initiated by the Cikananga Wildlife Center in Java (since 2011) and a few European EAZA zoos (since 2015). It has successfully bred at both the Javan and European facilities, and as of 2018 this captive population had reached about 50 individuals.

References

Javan green magpie
Birds of Java
Critically endangered fauna of Asia
Javan green magpie